Dialogus (Latin for dialogue) can refer to:
 Dialogus de oratoribus (c. 100 AD), treatise on rhetoric attributed to Tacitus
 Dialogus de musica (c. 11th c.), music treatise formerly attributed to Odo of Arezzo
 Dialogus de Scaccario (12th c.), treatise on the English Exchequer
 Dialogus super auctores (c. 1130), an introduction to the classics by Conrad of Hirsau
 Dialogus creaturarum (c. 1480), collection of Latin fables